Onigatani Saiji (鬼ヶ谷才治, April 19, 1855 – February 2, 1931) was a Japanese sumo wrestler who is known for being active in the top makuuchi division at the age of 51, which is a record after the beginning of the Meiji era.

Career
At first, he joined Tokitsukaze stable in Osaka sumo but was recruited by former yokozuna Umegatani I and moved to Ikazuchi stable in Tokyo sumo. From January 1887, he recorded a 20-year career in makuuchi. He was the oldest active wrestler in makuuchi from January 1897 when he was 41 years old. He retired in January 1907 when he was 51 years old. He was specially awarded a silver cup by the Sumo Association. He also trained future yokozuna Umegatani II.

Top division record

References

See also
Glossary of sumo terms
List of past sumo wrestlers

1855 births
1931 deaths
Japanese sumo wrestlers
Sumo people from Ehime Prefecture
Komusubi